Burgess Hill Town Football Club is an English football club currently playing in the . The club plays its home games at the More Than Tyres Stadium (Leylands Park) in Burgess Hill, West Sussex.

History
Burgess Hill Football Club was founded in 1882 and was a founder member of the Sussex County Football Association. The club attained the unique achievement of winning the Sussex Senior Cup three years running thus retaining it permanently in the process. The cup is on display in the trophy cabinet in the club boardroom. The current trophy was presented to the S.C.F.A. by Burgess Hill Town Football Club.  In the club's formative years they were also founder members of the Mid-Sussex Football League, and won the League Championship in its inaugural season.

Following several successful seasons the club joined the Sussex County League for the 1958–59 season, and stayed until attaining promotion to the Southern Football League in 2003. In 1969 the club amalgamated with Worlds End F.C., changed name to Burgess Hill Town and with the help of Burgess Hill Town Council were able to move to Leylands Park, the club's current home. In 1971, the club gained promotion to Division One, only to be relegated two seasons later. 1974 saw the 'Hillians' reach another landmark achievement by becoming the only club ever to have won both the League Challenge Cup and the Division Two Cup in the same season. In 1976 a hat trick of achievements were completed by winning the Division One Championship by six points, having secured the Division Two title the previous season.

During the ensuing twenty years in the top flight of the County League success was modest. In 1980 the League Challenge Cup was secured and in 1992 the RUR Cup was added. However, all this changed in season 1996–97 under the guidance of club manager, Alan Pook. The club became Division One champions by twelve points, won the Floodlight Cup, and were runners up in the League Challenge Cup. The 2nd XI finished runners up in the Reserve Premier and won the Mid-Sussex Charity Cup, while the Youth XI won their overall championship. In 1997–98, the club 1st XI attained even more success by again winning the League Championship and the League Challenge Cup, also reaching the last sixteen in the F.A. Vase. Additionally they reached the Sussex Senior Cup Final and were top of the county's merit table. The Youth XI also finished as 'Double Champions' in the sector.

The 1998–99 season saw the Hillians achieve a unique treble in winning the Championship for a post war record third time and again securing a league and cup double, back to back. The 2nd XI won their cup and were runners up in the league, missing out by a single point. Not to be out done, the Youth XI won their league and only missed out on a double by goal difference.

The club then appointed new manager Gary Croydon for season 1999–2000. He led the Hillians to take runners' up spot in the league and to a record fourth qualifying round FA Cup tie against Hereford United. Again a last 16 place was achieved in the FA Vase as well as winning the RUR Cup and the Floodlit Cup.

The new millennium season saw Hillians take the league championship with the team remaining unbeaten in the league until April; the club also had its best ever run in the FA Vase only being beaten after extra time by eventual finalists Tiptree United in the last eight, before a club record attendance of 1598. With plans being laid for Southern League football, club directors, Gary Croydon and Eddie Benson appointed Danny Bloor as manager for season 2002–2003. The club was rewarded with yet another championship crown, the fifth in seven seasons.

Gary Croydon took over the Hillians again as the club entered the Southern League for the first ever time. After just missing out on the play-offs, Burgess Hill Town moved over to the Isthmian League due to the restructuring of the non-league pyramid. After the first season in the Isthmian League manager Gary Croydon stepped down and was replaced by Steve Johnson in May 2005. But six months later with the Hillians bottom of the League, Croydon took over again with assistance from Jim Thompson and Peter Miles as the club avoided relegation.

For the 2007–08 season, the club appointed former professional player Jamie Howell as first team manager. He was sacked on 4 March 2009. In May 2009 Gary Croydon announced his appointment as first team manager once again for the 2009–10 season.

At the start of the 2011–12 season, manager Gary Croydon stepped down as to concentrate more on his chief executive role as the club look for a new ground on the outskirts of the town near the Triangle Leisure Centre.

Taking over the manager role was Simon Rowland who had guided AFC Uckfield to the Sussex County League Division 2 title the previous season. He was assisted by former Brighton & Hove Albion youth coach Ben White. The pair were sacked after a 7–0 defeat at Godalming and John Rattle was put in charge for the final seven league fixtures. Relegation was avoided on the last day of the season by defeating Dulwich Hamlet.

Former Brighton & Hove Albion defender Ian Chapman was appointed manager around 2011.  He steered the club to promotion from the 8th tier in the 2014–15 season as his side obtained 109 points.  The Hillians played in the 7th tier of English football, their highest ever standings until they were relegated at the end of the 2018–19 season. The team reached the Sussex Senior Challenge Cup final in the 2018–19 season, guided by former Lewes coach Simon Wormull, who had replaced Chapman after a defeat away to Bognor Regis Town.  Bognor also defeated the Hillians in the Sussex Senior Cup final Ross Murdoch scored the only goal for Hill in a 2–1 defeat after extra time.

Back in the 8th tier the Hillians started off the 2019–20 campaign by beating league favourites Hythe Town 7–2 at Leylands Park, but after a run of poor form Wormull was sacked and former Brentford defender Jay Lovett was named as his successor.

Ground

Burgess Hill Town play their home games at Leylands Park, Maple Drive, Burgess Hill, Sussex, RH15 8DL.

Reserves and youth
The team have a youth team which currently plays in the Isthmian Youth South. The youth team won the Sussex County Cup in the 2010–11 season. Until the 2011–12 season the club also ran a reserve team but they disbanded due to financial problems at the club. Both teams, like the first team, play at Leylands Park.  In the 2014–15 season the youth team is managed by Ian South and Paul Armstrong with the u21s run by Neil Wheeler and Peter Miles .

Club honours

League 
Isthmian League
Division One South Champions (1): 2014-15

Sussex County League
Division 1 Champions (6): 1975–76, 1996–97, 1997–98, 1998–99, 2001–02, 2002–03
Division 2 Champions: (1): 1974–75

Mid-Sussex Football League
Champions (5): 1900–01, 1903–04, 1939–40, 1946–47, 1956–57

Cups 
Floodlit Cup 
 Winners (2): 1997, 2000

The Sussex Royal Ulster Rifles Charity Cup
Winners (2): 1991–92, 1999–2000
Runners Up (3): 1977–78, 1998–99, 2000–01

John O’Hara League Challenge Cup
 Winners (4): 1973–74, 1979–80, 1997–98, 1998–99

Sussex Senior Challenge Cup
 Winners (3): 1883–84, 1884–85, 1885–86

Roy Hayden Trophy
 Winners (1): 2003–04

Norman Wingate Trophy
Winners (1): 2002–03

Mid Sussex Senior Charity Cup
Winners (3): 1992–93, 1996–97, 2001–02

Mowatt Cup
Winners (1): 1945–46

Montgomery Cup
Winners (2): 1939–40, 1956–57

Other 
 Sussex County Reserve Section 
Champions (5): 1977–78, 1979–80, 1984–85, 1989–90, 1991–92
 Sussex County Reserve Section Cup 
Winners (5): 1982–83, 1989–90, 1992–93, 1998–99, 2002–03
 Sussex Intermediate Cup
Winners (1): 1976–77
 Sussex Junior Cup 
Winners (1): 1889–90
 Sussex County Youth League 
Champions (6): 1992–93, 1993–94, 1995–96, 1996–97, 1997–98, 2004–05
 Sussex County Youth League Cup 
Winners (5): 1991–92, 1997–98, 1999–2000, 2003–04, 2004—05
 Sussex Youth Cup 
Winners (1): 2004–05

Records
Best league performance: 21st Isthmian League Premier Division 2015-16
Best FA Cup performance: 4th qualifying round, 1999-00 (lost 4–1 vs. Hereford United), 2008–09 (lost 3–0 vs. Harlow Town), 2014–15 (away to Dartford)
Best FA Trophy performance: 2nd round proper, 2003–04, 2004–05, 2014–15
Best FA Vase performance: Quarter-finals, 2001–02 (lost 2–1 vs. Tiptree United)
Record attendance: 2,005 vs AFC Wimbledon, 30 April 2005
Most appearances: Paul Williams, 499
Most goals: Ashley Carr, 208

Sources

See also

References

External links
Official website

 
Isthmian League
Football clubs in West Sussex
Association football clubs established in 1882
Football
Southern Football League clubs
1882 establishments in England
Football clubs in England
Mid-Sussex Football League